The 1931–32 season was West Ham's eighth season in the First Division since their promotion in season 1922–23. The club were managed by Syd King.

Season summary

As a warm-up to the season West Ham completed a three match unbeaten tour of Switzerland and began the season with their first ever win at Bolton's Burnden Park. This would be one of only 12 wins all season which saw poor form for the team. February saw the return of Syd Puddefoot to the club, after ten years away, but his seven appearances and no goals did nothing to stave off relegation. West Ham gained a single point from their last 10 games, finished 22nd and bottom and were relegated to the Second Division.  Vic Watson was the top scorer with 25 goals in all competitions. He was also top scorer in the league with 23. Jimmy Ruffell made the most appearances; 41 in all competitions.

Relegation for West Ham had a dramatic effect on the mental health of manager King. Suffering from delusions, these became chronic during the season and were a factor towards his sacking and death the following season.

West Ham made the fourth round of the FA Cup before being eliminated by Chelsea.

First Division

Results
West Ham United's score comes first

Legend

Football League First Division

FA Cup

Squad

References

West Ham United F.C. seasons
1931 sports events in London
1932 sports events in London
West Ham United